Chevalierella is a monotypic snout moth genus described by Jean Ghesquière in 1943. Its only species, Chevalierella elaeidis, described by the same author in the same year, is found in the Democratic Republic of the Congo.

References

Galleriini
Moths described in 1943
Snout moths of Africa
Moths of Africa